Pam Tillis Collection is a compilation of songs that Pam Tillis did for Warner Brothers before going on to bigger success with Arista. It was released February 1, 1994. Collection was reissued by Warner Brothers in 2000 as Super Hits, not to be confused with two other Tillis albums also called Super Hits, released by both Arista and BMG.

Critical reception

Brian Mansfield of AllMusic says, "what makes Collection interesting is early versions of "One of Those Things" and "Maybe It Was Memphis" as well as a version of "Five Minutes," later a hit for Lorrie Morgan."

Alanna Nash of EW writes, "What a difference a new producer makes! Warner Bros. spent five years of the '80s trying to do what Arista then did in one, which is make Mel's little girl a star. Here's Pam Tillis Collection (Warner Bros.), the best of what she recorded before leaving for her current label."

Kevin John Coyne of Country Universe remarks, "It has to be frustrating for a label to see an artist that they never had success with go on to another label in town and become a big star right off the bat."

Track listing

Production

Producer – Steve Buckingham, Marshall Morgan
Selections compiled by Martha Sharp
Digitally remastered by Ken Love at MasterMix, Nashville, TN
Art Direction – Aimee McMahan
Design – George Otvos

Track information and credits verified from the album's liner notes, AllMusic and Discogs.

References

External links
Pam Tillis Official Site
Warner Records Official Site

1994 compilation albums
Pam Tillis albums
Warner Records compilation albums